HMS Boxer was the first of the Batch 2 Type 22 frigates of the Royal Navy. She was decommissioned on 4 August 1999 and expended as a target in August 2004.

Service
She was one of only two Batch 2s (the other being Beaver) fitted with the lower-height hangar of the Batch 1s, so she could only accommodate Lynx helicopters.

During 1996 and 1997 she was leader of the 1st Frigate Squadron.

Commanding officers

References

Publications
 

1981 ships
Type 22 frigates of the Royal Navy
Ships sunk as targets